Baron Sten Carl Bielke, born 14 March 1709 in Stockholm, Sweden; died 13 July 1753, was a Swedish Friherre, official, scientist and member of the House of Nobility of the Swedish Diet. His father was the Landshövding Baron Ture Stensson Bielke and his mother was Ursula Kristina Törne.

Bielke was together with Carl Linnaeus a founding member of the Royal Swedish Academy of Sciences, which was founded in 1739. He was a patron of the scholar Pehr Kalm.

He received a private education and started his career as an amanuensis at the Royal Library (Kungliga biblioteket) in Sweden. He eventually became 'a Justice of the Hovrätt (Court of Appeal) in Åbo (present Finland). He was also politically active in the Caps.

References 

Members of the Riksdag of the Estates
Members of the Royal Swedish Academy of Sciences
1709 births
1753 deaths
18th-century Swedish politicians
18th-century Swedish scientists